Whiteford Township may refer to the following places:

 Whiteford Township, Monroe County, Michigan
 Whiteford Township, Marshall County, Minnesota

See also

Whiteford (disambiguation)

Township name disambiguation pages